Kathryn Suzanne Steding (born December 11, 1967) is a former collegiate and professional basketball player. She is currently an assistant coach for the Stanford Cardinal women's basketball team.

College career
Steding was born in Portland, Oregon, and recruited to Stanford University from Lake Oswego High School near Portland. At Stanford, Steding, a power forward, helped lead Stanford to its first NCAA Women's Division I Basketball Championship in 1990. Steding recorded ten steals in a game against Northwestern in 1988. The ten steals represents the school record for steals in a single game. When she was a freshman, she averaged 8.7 rebounds per game, which still stands (as of 2014) as a school record.

USA Basketball
Steding was named to the team representing the USA at the World University Games held during July 1991 in Sheffield, England. While the USA team had won gold in 1983, they finished with the silver in 1985, in fifth place in 1987, and did not field a team in 1989. The team was coached by Tara VanDerveer of Stanford. After winning opening games easily, the USA faced China in the medal round. The USA shot only 36% from the field, but limited the team from China to 35%, and won 79–76 to advance to the gold medal game. There they faced 7–0 Spain, but won 88–62 to claim the gold medal. Steding averaged 10.3 points per game.

Steding was selected to represent the USA at the 1995 USA Women's Pan American Games, however, only four teams committed to participate, so the event was cancelled.

After Stanford, Steding played basketball in Japan and Spain (Banco Exterior 1993–1994) in the early 1990s before earning a spot on the U.S. national team, where she earned a gold medal in the 1996 Summer Olympics.

Professional career
With the formation of the American Basketball League in 1996, Steding returned to Oregon and became the founding player for the Portland Power. When the league folded in 1998, Steding joined the WNBA and played the 2000 season with the Sacramento Monarchs and the 2001 season with the Seattle Storm before retiring from professional basketball. She was drafted by the Monarchs with the 14th overall pick of the 2000 draft.

Coaching career

In 2001, Steding was named head women's basketball coach at Warner Pacific College. Under her leadership, Warner Pacific went to the NAIA basketball tournament for the first time in school history in 2004. In 2006, Steding's team won its first Cascade Conference championship and returned to the NAIA tournament. Steding was selected as Cascade Conference Coach of the Year. Also in 2006, she took a position as Director of Marketing and College Relations for Warner Pacific.

In 2008, Steding was named an assistant coach of the WNBA expansion team Atlanta Dream. After one year with the Dream, she was hired as an assistant coach for Columbia Lions women's basketball. In 2010, Steding was hired as an assistant coach for the San Francisco Dons women's basketball team, working with head coach and former Stanford teammate Jennifer Azzi.

In May 2012, Steding was named an assistant coach of the California Golden Bears women's basketball team.

In June 2014, she was named as the new head coach of Boston University Terriers women's basketball where she remained until 2018.

In 2020, Steding became an assistant coach for her alma mater, the Stanford Cardinal women's basketball team.

Head coaching record

Personal
Steding was inducted into the Oregon Sports Hall of Fame in 2004, and is also a member of the Stanford Athletic Hall of Fame.

References

External links
 WNBA statistics

1967 births
Living people
Basketball coaches from Oregon
Basketball players from Atlanta
Basketball players from Portland, Oregon
People from Tualatin, Oregon
Sportspeople from Lake Oswego, Oregon
Sportspeople from Portland, Oregon
American women academics
American women's basketball coaches
American women's basketball players
Atlanta Dream coaches
Basketball players at the 1996 Summer Olympics
Boston University Terriers women's basketball coaches
California Golden Bears women's basketball coaches
Lake Oswego High School alumni
Medalists at the 1991 Summer Universiade
Medalists at the 1996 Summer Olympics
Olympic gold medalists for the United States in basketball
Portland Power players
Sacramento Monarchs players
San Francisco Dons women's basketball coaches
Seattle Storm players
Small forwards
Stanford Cardinal women's basketball coaches
Stanford Cardinal women's basketball players
United States women's national basketball team players
Universiade gold medalists for the United States
Universiade medalists in basketball
Warner Pacific University faculty